Peacemaker is an American barquentine owned by the Twelve Tribes religious group.

History 
 Peacemaker, originally named Avany, was built on a riverbank in southern Brazil using traditional methods and tropical hardwoods, and was launched in 1989. The original owner and his family motored in the southern Atlantic Ocean before bringing the ship up through the Caribbean to Savannah, Georgia, where they intended to rig it as a three-masted staysail Marconi rigged motor sailer. The work was never done, however, and in the summer of 2000, it was purchased by the Twelve Tribes, a religious group with 50 or so communities in North and South America, Europe, and Australia. They spent the next seven years replacing all of the ship’s mechanical and electrical systems and rigging it as a barquentine. The refit vessel set sail for the first time in the spring of 2007, under the name Peacemaker.

Purpose 
Peacemaker is used to travel between the communities of the Twelve Tribes while providing an apprenticeship program for their youth in sailing, seamanship, navigation, and boat maintenance.

The ship has a United States Coast Guard attraction vessel permit and is available for festivals and dockside hospitality events.

Features 
Peacemaker has a large deckhouse and spacious cabins finished in mahogany, modeled after the interior of Cutty Sark. It also has an innovative transom that can be lowered while in port to reveal a watertight bulkhead with two large doors opening into a cargo area and fully equipped workshop.

Present day 
In 2013, Peacemaker participated in the Tall Ships 1812 Tour, a pan-provincial event that traveled throughout Ontario during the summer of 2013, commemorating the bicentennial of the War of 1812. Sixteen ports participated in this event which partnered with the Tall Ships Challenge Great Lakes 2013 series. The first port of call for the tour was Brockville, Ontario, June 14–16, 2013.

In 2015,  Peacemaker was listed for sale and gained notoriety when it was published that the Vollmer twins had hopes of purchasing it for use as what can best be described as a voyage to their deaths, with 'tribesmembers (including Zerubabel) coming along to teach final use of the vessel. The deal reportedly did not go forward when a Venezuelan bond package failed, resulting in lack of funds.

The Twelve Tribes brought the Peacemaker for a visit to Rhode Island in July, 2021.

References

External links
Peacemaker homepage
Twelve Tribes communities Peacemaker information page
Peacemaker Tall Ship Video, Boston Globe
 Peacemaker Yacht for Sale Expired for sale listing at Northrop & Johnson 
 Latest position and details from Marine Traffic.

Tall ships of the United States
Barquentines
1989 ships